UTI Mutual Fund was carved out of the erstwhile Unit Trust of India (UTI) as a Securities and Exchange Board of India (SEBI) registered mutual fund from 1 February 2003. The Unit Trust of India Act 1963 was repealed, paving way for the bifurcation of UTI into: Specified Undertaking of Unit Trust of India (SUUTI) and UTI Mutual Fund (UTIMF).

T Rowe Price Group Inc (TRP Group), through its wholly owned subsidiary T. Rowe Price Global Investment Services Ltd. (TRP), has acquired a 26% stake in UTI Asset Management Company Limited (UTI AMC).

UTI Mutual Fund is the oldest and one of the largest mutual funds in India with over 10 million investor accounts under its 230 domestic schemes/plans as of September 2017.

UTI Mutual Fund has a nationwide distribution network, which is spread across the length and breadth of the country. Its distribution network comprises over 48000 AMFI/NISM certified Independent Financial Advisors and 174 Financial Centers.

UTI Mutual Fund has been the pioneer for launching various schemes viz. UTI Unit Linked Insurance Plan (ULIP) with life and accident cover (Launched in 1971), UTI Mastershare (Launched in 1986), India's first Offshore Fund – India fund (Launched in 1986), UTI Wealth Builder Fund, the first of its kind in the Indian mutual fund industry combining different asset classes i.e. equity and gold which are lowly correlated.

UTI Mastershare Fund has also been rated No. 1 by Crisil, just like the IDBI India Top 100 Equity Fund. The scheme was started way back in 1986, making it one of the oldest in the country, The assets under management are close to Rs 10,000 crores. An investor can start a SIP with a small amount of Rs 100. The 3-year returns from the scheme is 14% on an annualised basis, while the 5-year returns are around that 10% mark.

See also 

 Mutual funds in India

References

External links
Official Website
International Website
History of Mutual Funds in India

Mutual funds of India
Government-owned companies of India
Financial services companies based in Mumbai
Financial services companies established in 1963
1963 establishments in Maharashtra